The Faculty of Engineering is a faculty of the University of Sydney, Australia. It was established in 1920 and is Australia's oldest engineering school.

The Faculty of Engineering has an excellent global academic reputation, and is ranked 14th in the world for Civil and Structural Engineering and 42nd in the world for Computer Science as per the 2020 QS World University Rankings by Subject.

Programs within the Faculty of Engineering are accredited by professional bodies including Engineers Australia, the Project Management Institute and the Australian Computer Society.

History
Teaching of engineering at the University began in 1883 within the Faculty of Science established just a year prior. The Faculty of Engineering itself was established in 1920.

Initially engineering classes were taught in The Quad, however in 1909 the P. N. Russell School of Engineering was completed. This building, an outcome of the P. N. Russell benefactions was formally opened by the Governor on 20 September 1909. With the expansion in student numbers in the 1950s and early 1960s, new purpose-built facilities were constructed in the Darlington extension area across City Road and since the mid seventies all departments have been accommodated in this area, although a wind tunnel in the Woolley Building is still in use by Aeronautical Engineering.

The new SciTech Library opened in the Darlington engineering precinct in 2010, as the amalgamation of the Architecture, Engineering, Madsen and Mathematics libraries, brought together as part of the Campus 2010 project.

Faculty schools
 School of Aerospace, Mechanical and Mechatronic Engineering
 School of Biomedical Engineering
 School of Chemical and Biomolecular Engineering
 School of Civil Engineering
 School of Computer Science
 School of Electrical and Information Engineering
 School of Project Management

Research centres
 Australian Centre for Field Robotics
 Australian Centre for Microscopy and Microanalysis
 Centre for Advanced Food Engineering
 Centre for Advanced Materials Technology
 Centre for Advanced Structural Engineering
 Centre for Distributed and High-Performance Computing
 Centre for Future Energy Networks
 Centre for IoT and Telecommunications
 Centre for Sustainable Energy Development
 Centre for Wind, Waves and Water
 John Grill Institute for Project Leadership
 Rio Tinto Centre for Mine Automation
 Sydney Artificial Intelligence Centre
 Sydney Centre in Geomechanics and Mining Materials
 Sydney Institute of Robotics and Intelligent Systems
 The Warren Centre for Advanced Engineering

Notable alumni
 John Bradfield - designer of Sydney Harbour Bridge
 Paul Scully-Power - Australia's first Astronaut
 Michael Hintze - billionaire hedge fund manager and philanthropist
 David Higgins - CEO of Network Rail and former CEO of Lend Lease
 John Grill - billionaire founder of WorleyParsons

References

External links

1920 establishments in Australia
Engineering, Faculty of